Henry Lord (born May 7, 1847) was an American businessman and politician from Bangor, Maine. Lord served 4 terms in the Maine Legislature. In 1877 and 1878, he was elected to single-year terms to the Maine House of Representatives. In 1878, he was Speaker. In 1886, Bangor voters sent Lord back to Augusta to serve in the Maine Senate. He was re-elected two years later and chosen by his fellow Senators as Senate President. He also served on the Bangor City Council.

Outside of the legislature, Lord was a well-known businessman involved exporting products. He was also president of the board of trustees of the Maine State College and president of the board of Westbrook Seminary.

References

1847 births
Year of death missing
University of Maine people
Westbrook College
Republican Party members of the Maine House of Representatives
Bangor City Council members
Businesspeople from Maine
Speakers of the Maine House of Representatives
Presidents of the Maine Senate